Evelyn Herbert, Countess of Carnarvon may refer to:
 First wife of Henry Herbert, 4th Earl of Carnarvon
 Lady Evelyn Herbert (1901–1980), daughter of George Herbert, 5th Earl of Carnarvon